The Subaru B9 Scrambler (also known as the Subaru B9SC) is an open two-seat concept sports car from Subaru featuring classic styling. It was designed by Andreas Zapatinas.

Design

This concept car was first shown in 2003 at the Tokyo Motor Show. It was designed with influence from Subaru's aircraft heritage, with the front end appearing to look like the cross section of an airliner, with a central jet intake and wings. This theme was originally developed for the Subaru B11S which had been exhibited in Spring 2003. The lower panels of the B9 are dent resistant. 

Car and Driver speculated the Pontiac Solstice roadster could have been based on the same platform as the B9 Scrambler, as General Motors held a minority stake in Subaru's parent company, Fuji Heavy Industries, from 1999 to 2005.

Technical

The automobile features a 2.0 litre flat-4 cylinder hybrid powertrain, which Subaru calls the Sequential Series Hybrid Electric Vehicle (SSHEV). Under , the gasoline engine may be used to charge the battery or under heavy acceleration. It is Subaru's first hybrid powertrain, and Subaru president Kyoji Takenaka stated that existing conventionally-powered Subaru models required "no modification" to install the SSHEV.

The ride height can be adjusted through a self-leveling air suspension. Front and rear-facing cameras, coupled with a radar system are used in an intelligent cruise control and lane departure warning system.

In popular media
 The B9SC is a featured vehicle in the 2005 video game WRC: Rally Evolved.

References

External links

 
 
 
 
 

B9 Scrambler
Sports cars